André Jack Calisir (born 13 June 1990) is an Armenian professional footballer who plays as a centre-back for Swedish club IF Brommapojkarna. Born in Sweden, Calisir represents the Armenia national team.

Club career
Calisir began playing football in Djurgården's youth organization. He made his Allsvenskan debut on 9 May 2010, away against Örebro SK. Calisir's contract with Djurgården expired in December 2011 and was not extended. He joined second division side Jönköping with whom he won the Superettan in 2015 and secured promotion to the first division.

Calisir joined IFK Göteborg in 2018 following Jönköping's relegation from the Allsvenskan. He came on as an extra-time substitute in IFK's defeat of Malmö FF in the 2020 Svenska Cupen Final on 30 July 2020.

International career
As a Swedish citizen of Armenian and Assyrian descent, Calisir was eligible to play for Sweden or Armenia in international football. He played for the Swedish youth teams, but opted to accept the call-up to the Armenia in May 2018.

Personal life
Calisir was born in Sweden and is of Armenian and Assyrian descent. His father is an Assyrian born in Turkey, and his mother, who is of Armenian descent, made him eligible to represent the Armenia national team.

Honours
Jönköping
Superettan: 2015

IFK Göteborg
Svenska Cupen: 2019–20

References

External links 

1990 births
Living people
Armenian footballers
Armenia international footballers
Swedish footballers
Footballers from Stockholm
Assyrian footballers
Association football defenders
Sweden youth international footballers
Swedish people of Armenian descent
Swedish people of Assyrian/Syriac descent
Citizens of Armenia through descent
Allsvenskan players
Superettan players
Super League Greece players
Danish Superliga players
Djurgårdens IF Fotboll players
Jönköpings Södra IF players
Skellefteå FF players
IFK Göteborg players
Apollon Smyrnis F.C. players
Silkeborg IF players
IF Brommapojkarna players
Swedish expatriate footballers
Swedish expatriate sportspeople in Greece
Expatriate footballers in Greece
Swedish expatriate sportspeople in Denmark
Expatriate men's footballers in Denmark